The 2012 ACB Playoffs were the final phase of the 2011–12 ACB season. It started on May 17, 2012 and ended on June 16, 2012. FC Barcelona Regal retained the title, winning their 17th Spanish league.

All times are CEST (UTC+02:00).

Bracket

Quarterfinals
The quarterfinals are best-of-3 series.

FC Barcelona Regal vs. Lucentum Alicante

Valencia Basket vs. Lagun Aro GBC

Real Madrid vs. Banca Cívica

Caja Laboral vs. Gescrap Bizkaia

Semifinals
The semifinals are best-of-5 series.

FC Barcelona Regal vs. Valencia Basket

Real Madrid vs. Caja Laboral

Finals

FC Barcelona Regal vs. Real Madrid
The finals are best-of-5 series.

ACB Finals MVP:  Erazem Lorbek

References

External links
ACB.com

Liga ACB playoffs
Playoffs